Jnana Prabodhini, which means 'Awakener of Knowledge' in Sanskrit, is a social organization in India. Founded in 1962 with the motto "motivating intelligence for social change", its activities have expanded into multiple aspects of social work. The main activity of the organization is to provide education. It aims at refining the physical, mental, intellectual, and spiritual qualities of people in general and of the youth in particular, believing that this development will encourage positive social leadership qualities. Its activities are centered in the fields of education, research, rural development, health, and youth organisation.

The organization is headquartered in Pune, Maharashtra, formed around a cluster of public charitable trusts. It is active in most districts of Maharashtra, with facilities in Pune, Nigdi, Salumbre, Solapur, Harali, and Ambajogai. It does some work in parts of Jammu and Kashmir and the northeastern states of India. The organization has started a school in Nigdi, Solapur and Sadashiv Peth, Pune.

Foundation and activities 

Jnana Prabodhini was founded by psychologist, educator and social organizer Shri V. V. Pendse, who was inspired by Swami Vivekananda to create an organization that would change the nation through "man-making education". This is an extension of the Hindu concept of "Dharm-Sansthapana" – a belief in cycles of societal resurgence and reconstruction propelled by ancient heroes and saints. This belief was advocated by Samarth Ramdas in the 17th century, and by Maharshi Dayanand, Swami Vivekananda, and Yogi Arvinda. Having studied leadership styles, Pendse believed that a congenial atmosphere for education would inspire even-mindedness, and that intelligence was present among all social castes. The organization sought to identify intelligence at an impressionable age, and initially conducted enrichment programs at the high school level.

According to the organization's website, its vision is to transform society through education with a core of spirituality, enabling leaders to emerge who will be motivated to serve society with compassion. It also seeks to create an organization of selfless workers across all walks of life. Its primary area of activity is leadership development, which has been carried out in the sectors of education, research, health, rural development, women's empowerment (Hindi: Stree Shakti Prabodhan), national integration, and youth organization.

Facilities 
Jnana Prabodhini is headquartered in Pune, Maharashtra, India, and is most active in that state.  It operates centres at Nigdi, Solapur and Harali, and has about ten smaller facilities in the state.  The organization has informal work groups in most districts of Maharashtra, and also has a presence in the neighbouring states of Gujarat, Madhya Pradesh, Chhattisgarh and Karnataka, and also in Arunachal Pradesh and in Jammu and Kashmir.

Main centers

The Nigdi Center (Navnagar Vidyalaya) is located in the Pimpri-Chinchwad industrial area. It is a Marathi and English medium school with enrolment for 2,500 students from pre-primary level to class 10 level. It runs two education experiments:  the Gurukul project, which seeks to develop the panchkoshas (five sheaths of personality) and the Kreedakul sports academy. The center also has a hall for cultural programs, a music school and a gymnasium.

The Solapur Center consists of a Marathi and semi-English medium school (pre-primary to class 10) and a college for pre-primary teachers. It operates training courses and special activities, including adventure camps, study tours, youth activities, elocution competitions, and workshops for students from other schools. It also operates classes for child laborers from the city, and hosts a satsang association for followers of different faiths, holding ceremonies and offering lecture series on spiritual topics.

The Harali Center was created in the aftermath of the 1993 Latur earthquake, and is an agriculture-based educational center in Osmanabad district. It consists of a 370-student school (class 1 to 10), with boarding for 250 students from villages in the surrounding region. It also runs a diploma course in agriculture affiliated to the Vasantrao Naik Marathwada Agricultural University, Parbhani. The agricultural farm has around 7,000 fruit trees and a fruit-processing unit, and has demonstrative installations of solar, bio and wind energy, waste water treatment and a garden nursery. the center also hosts a spiritual retreat facility and a residential training facility.

Sub-centers 
Gram Prabodhini Vidyalaya is a rural secondary school in the Mawal taluka of Pune district, established through a joint venture of Pune North Rotary charitable trust and Jnana Prabodhini. It consists of a fully residential gurukula, a science and technology centre, and farming and cattle-rearing projects.

Jnana Prabodhini Medical Trust was founded by alumni of Jnana Prabodhini Prashala and is based on the principles of ethical and rational medical practice. It handles the management of the Deenanath Mangeshkar Hospital and the Mai Mangeshkar Hospital, Pune, and a fully equipped eye hospital at Shirwal, Satara district. It conducts medical check-up camps in rural areas.

Extension centers

The Dombivali Extension Center is housed in a building initially used as a distribution centre for Jnana Prabodhini's magazine Chhatra Prabodhan and book sales.  It consists of a Prabodhak Mandal and conducts camps, adventure tours, Vidyavrat samskar, and aptitude testing for children. It facilitates study groups, environment group and gatherings for youth, parent clubs, training for women priests, Matrubhoomi Poojan and Samwadini (for women). Its activities are mainly focused on Kalyan, Badlapur and Thane regions.

The Borivali Extension Center was also a distribution center for Jnana Prabodhini's publications. It conducts activities for children and others such as Vikasika (personality development sessions), trips, Vidyavrat Samskar, aptitude tests, lectures and workshops, Matrubhoomi Poojan and Samwadini for women. This center conducts its extension activities at Andheri, Dadar, Bandra, Wada and Palghar.

The Ambajogai Extension Center conducts programmes for the development of the local youth of Ambajogai and its surrounding area. It facilitates upasana (meditation) centres and Vidyavrat Samskar (vow of studentship), and houses a Shishuvihar for the development of pre-primary students. Special-purpose groups have formed such as the Maa Sharada group, Sphoorti group and Geeta Prabodhini and the Vivekwadi Campus for Rural Development.

Notable alumni
 Manoj Mukund Naravane
 Avinash Dharmadhikari
 Palash Pai Raiturka

References

External links
Official website
Jnana Prabodhini's Chhatra Prabodhan magazine
Jnana Prabodhini Prashala
Kreedakul

Private schools in Maharashtra
High schools and secondary schools in Maharashtra
Educational institutions established in 1960
Organisations based in Pune
1960 establishments in Maharashtra